Brigadier  Desmond Hayde MVC (1926-2013) was an officer in the Indian Army. He was the commanding officer of the 3rd battalion of the Jat Regiment (3 Jat) in the Battle of Dograi during the Indo-Pakistani War of 1965. He led his battalion of 550 men and defeated an enemy force that was double the size of his own battalion. He was awarded the Maha Vir Chakra for his contribution in the war.

Early life
Desmond Hayde was born on 28 November 1926 in Exeter, England. He was of Irish descent, and his father worked in the Indian Railways.

Indo-Pakistan War of 1965
As part of Operation Riddle, 3 Jat was initially ordered to breach the Ichhogil Canal, which ran for 8 kilometres inside Pakistan. The western side (the Lahore side) was lined with Pakistani concrete pillboxes that had overlapping arcs of fire. The Dograi township on the eastern bank of the Canal near the Grand Trunk road was captured by 3 Jat by 1100 hours on 6 September 1965. By 1200 hours on 6 September 1965, 3 Jat had captured the Batapore and Attokeawan localities on the west bank of the Canal despite stiff enemy opposition. It was for this action that Lt. Col. Hayde was awarded the Maha Vir Chakra. However, the battalion had to fall back as the other units detailed to support them in the offensive could not reach them in time due to a miscommunication. 3 Jat stood their ground alone until they were ordered to withdraw by brigade headquarters. The miscommunication error resulted in the removal of a major general from his post.

3 Jat then had to wait 2 weeks in defence at Santpura village in Pakistan before they were given orders to take Dograi, a town in the immediate vicinity of Lahore. By this time, the Pakistan Army had heavily fortified the town. On the night of 21 September 1965, during the impending attack on Dograi, Hayde made two demands of his men:
Ek bhi aadmi pichhe nahin hatega! (Not a single man will turn back!)
Zinda ya murda, Dograi mein milna hai! (Dead or alive, we have to meet in Dograi!)

3 Jat then marched 8 kilometres from their trenches to Dograi, where the Pakistan Army had entrenched itself. The Pakistani force consisted of 2 infantry battalions supported by a tank squadron. Hayde warned his men against retreating by saying "Even if all of you run away, I shall continue to stand on the battlefield alone". The battalion engaged in close quarter combat, and eventually captured Dograi. However, 86 troops of 3 Jat were killed. The Pakistani casualties were close to 300. The battle is known as the Battle of Dograi.

Hayde is also perhaps the only soldier to be painted by the famed M. F. Husain on the battlefield. It was during an address to his battalion later on 29 October in the same year in Pakistan that Prime Minister Lal Bahadur Shastri gave India one of its best known slogans: "Jai Jawan! Jai Kisan!" ("Victory to the soldiers! Victory to the Farmers!").

Maha Vir Chakra Citation
The citation for  the Maha Vir Chakra reads as follows

Later life
Hayde spent 30 years in the Indian Army before retiring as a brigadier in 1978. He then moved to Kotdwar in Uttarakhand, his wife's hometown. He set up the ex-servicemen league in Kotdwar and readily helped former members of the Jat Regiment. He donated some land upon which a school (now named Hayde Heritage Academy) was built in Kotdwar. He also adopted many stray dogs.

Personal life
Hayde married Sheela, a Garhwali from Kotdwar in what was then Uttar Pradesh, but is now in Uttarakhand. He met her when he was a young officer in Bareilly. They had three sons, one of whom joined the Indian Army and retired as a lieutenant colonel. Another son, Walter, lived in Canada until his passing away on 8 March 2017. 

Living descendants of Desmond Hayde in 2023 include Elizabeth Hayde and her son, Eric Groves.

Death
Brigadier Hayde died of skin cancer on 25 September 2013 in Kotdwar. He was buried alongside his wife in Bareilly cantonment, near the Jat Regimental Centre.

Legacy 
The Hayde Heritage Academy, Kotdwara, a school founded by him on the land donated by him, was renamed in his honor.

References

1926 births
2013 deaths
Recipients of the Maha Vir Chakra